Naveen Patnaik (born 16 October 1946) is an Indian politician serving as the current and 14th Chief Minister of Odisha. He is also the president of the Biju Janata Dal, a writer and has authored three books. He is the longest-serving chief minister of Odisha and as of 2023, one of the longest-serving chief ministers of any Indian state, holding the post for over two decades, and only the third Indian chief Minister after Pawan Chamling and Jyoti Basu to win five consecutive terms as Chief Minister of an Indian state.

Biography
Patnaik was born on 16 October 1946 in Cuttack to Biju Patnaik, former Chief Minister of Odisha, and his wife, Gyan Devi . He was educated at the Welham Boys' School in Dehradun, and later The Doon School. At Doon, he was a classmate of Sanjay Gandhi and three years junior to Rajiv Gandhi, who later became prime minister. After school, he went to the St. Stephen's College of Delhi University, and obtained a Bachelor of Arts degree.

Patnaik is a writer and had for the most part of his youth been away from both politics and Odisha, but after his father Biju Patnaik's demise, he entered politics in 1997 and a year later founded the Biju Janata Dal, named after Biju Patnaik, which won the state election with the BJP as its alliance and formed the government in which Patnaik became Chief Minister. His mild mannerism, "Stand against corruption" and "Pro-poor policies" have resulted in the development of a huge support base in Odisha, which has voted him to power in the last five consecutive terms. Like his father, he has managed to control the bureaucracy and transformed it into a machine for the development of the state. His spartan personal lifestyle and detachment from material possessions has been liked by the people of the state.
He is also one of the founding members of Indian National Trust for Art and Cultural Heritage. His elder sister is the writer Gita Mehta.

Political career

After the death of his father Biju Patnaik, leader of the Janata Dal, he was elected as a member to the 11th Lok Sabha in the by-election from Aska Parliamentary Constituency in Odisha, India. He was a member of the Consultative Committee of Ministry of Steel & Mines, Member of Standing Committee on Commerce, and Member Library Committee of Parliament. In 1997, the Janata Dal split and Naveen Patnaik founded the Biju Janata Dal which in alliance with the BJP-led National Democratic Alliance performed well and Naveen Patnaik was selected the Union Minister for Mines in the cabinet of A. B. Vajpayee.

Electoral history

Elections 2000
In the 2000 Assembly election, BJD won the majority of seats in alliance with the BJP in the Odisha Assembly elections, Patnaik resigned from the Union cabinet and was sworn in as the Chief Minister of Odisha.

Elections 2004
BJP led NDA lost the general elections in 2004, however, the coalition led by Naveen Patnaik emerged victorious in the state legislative elections and he continued as the Chief Minister. During this tenure, the friction between the ruling partners was getting more and more apparent, especially after the killing of Swami Laxmanananda Saraswati in the Kandhamal district of Odisha in 2007–2008 and also the active participation of Bajrang Dal in the riots that hit Kandhamal region.

Elections 2009
In the run-up to the polls for the Lok Sabha and Legislative Assembly of Odisha elections in 2009, BJD walked out of the NDA after severing ties with the BJP and joined the nascent Third Front constituted mainly by the Left Front and few regional parties. He did it after severely criticizing BJP's involvement in Kandhamal anti-Christian riots during 2007. The BJD won a resounding victory in both the Vidhan Sabha (State Assembly) as well as the Lok Sabha elections in 2009, winning 14 out of 21 Lok Sabha seats and 103 of the 147 assembly seats and was sworn in as the Chief Minister of Odisha on 21 May 2009 for the third consecutive term.

Elections 2014
Patnaik won a huge victory in both the 2014 Indian general elections and the Legislative Assembly of Odisha elections in 2014. Patnaik's Biju Janata Dal secured 20 out of the 21 Lok Sabha seats of Odisha and 117 of the 147 Odisha Vidhan Sabha seats.

Elections 2019
With a strong BJP wave across the country, the Biju Janata Dal, under the leadership of Naveen Patnaik won as many as 112 seats out of 146 (polls for 1 was deferred) in the Legislative Assembly of Odisha and 12 out of 21 Lok Sabha seats in 2019 Indian general elections.

Language
Patnaik spent most of his early days away from Odisha, so he has problems with writing and speaking fluently in Odia language. He is the only chief minister of India who does not speak fluently the regional language of his state and because of this, he has been facing severe criticism from his opponents. Presently, Patnaik has an adequate working knowledge of Odia and he possesses great mastery over Hindi, French, Punjabi, and English. At rallies, he delivers Odia speeches written in Roman alphabet.

Accolades

Recognitions
The United Nations in 2013, felicitated Naveen by presenting a citation for his government’s handling of Cyclone Phailin which hit Odisha in October 2013. The body also announced that the state’s efforts would be highlighted as a model for disaster management programs globally. Naveen was also invited by the international body to attend the 2015 Third UN World Conference on Disaster Risk Reduction (WCDRR), which was held in Sendai, Japan from 14 to 18 March 2015.
The United Nations in 2019, complimented Naveen for his government's proposal of reserving 33% of seats for women in the National Parliament as well as in the state's Legislative Assembly.

Writings
 A Second Paradise: Indian Courtly Life 1590–1947 – Published in India, England and US
 A Desert Kingdom: The People of Bikaner – Published in India, England and US
 The Garden of Life: An Introduction to the Healing Plants of India – Published in India, England and US

See also
 List of chief ministers of Odisha
 List of current Indian chief ministers
 List of longest-serving Indian chief ministers
 List of prime ministers of India
 List of presidents of India

References

External links

 
 Notable personalities of Odisha, including Naveen Patnaik, in Orissadiary website
Notable personalities of Odisha as per the Govt. of Odisha official web site
 Odisha's accidental politician, BBC
Official biographical sketch in Parliament of India website

1946 births
Living people
Chief Ministers of Odisha
People from Cuttack
Janata Dal politicians
Indian political party founders
Biju Janata Dal politicians
The Doon School alumni
St. Stephen's College, Delhi alumni
India MPs 1996–1997
India MPs 1998–1999
India MPs 1999–2004
Lok Sabha members from Odisha
Indian Hindus
Odisha MLAs 2000–2004
Odisha MLAs 2004–2009
Odisha MLAs 2009–2014
Odisha MLAs 2014–2019
Odisha MLAs 2019–2024